Strohl (or Ströhl, Stroehl) may refer to:

 Hugo Gerard Ströhl (1851–1919), Austrian heraldist
 André Strohl (1887–1977), physiologist, one of the discoverers of Guillain–Barré syndrome
 Joseph A. Strohl (1946– ), a Wisconsin, USA politician
 Thomas Ströhl (1988– ), German footballer